Onychomadesis is a periodic idiopathic shedding of the nails beginning at the proximal end, possibly caused by the temporary arrest of the function of the nail matrix. One cause in children is hand, foot, and mouth disease. This generally resolves without complication.

Onychomadesis can also occur if the nail is damaged or has a loss of blood supply; for example, due to a bruise. The nailbed turns black, and the nail drops off shortly afterwards. It takes around 6 to 12 months to regrow.

See also 
 Patterned acquired hypertrichosis
 List of cutaneous conditions

References 

Conditions of the skin appendages